Lewis Watts (born 1946) is an American photographer, archivist curator, art historian, author, lecturer, and educator. He is a Professor Emeritus of Art at the University of California, Santa Cruz (U.C. Santa Cruz).

Career 
Lewis Watts was born in 1946 in Little Rock, Arkansas. He has a BA degree in political science, as well as a MA degree in photography and design from University of California, Berkeley (U.C. Berkeley). He had taught at the University of California, Santa Cruz and the University of California, Berkeley, as well as other institutions for over 40 years.

His work is inspired by his historical and contemporary interests and representation of people in the African diaspora.

Watts work has been exhibited at and has collections at the San Francisco Museum of Modern Art, the Cité de la Musique (Paris, France), the Ogden Museum of Southern Art (New Orleans, Louisiana), the Oakland Museum of California, the Neuberger Museum of Art (Purchase, New York), the Amistad Center for Art and Culture (Hartford, Connecticut), Light Work (Syracuse, New York).

Exhibitions
 2017 – Mining the Archive, Rena Bransten Gallery, Minnesota Street Project, San Francisco, California
 2017 – Work from the Collection, Lewis Watts, Amistad Center of Art and Culture, Hartford, Connecticut
 2015–2017 – New Orleans, Photographs by Lewis Watts, Richmond Art Center, Richmond, California
 2016 – FRANCAIS, Photographs by Lewis Watts, San Francisco Museum of Modern Art, San Francisco, California
 1999 – Lifework Exhibit, Falkirk Cultural Center, San Rafael, California
 1999 – Photography of Lewis Watts, Hampshire College, Amherst, Massachusetts
 1999 – Lewis Watts, South to West Oakland, Robert B. Menschel Photography Gallery, Syracuse University, Syracuse, New York
 1998–1999 – Urban Foot Prints: The Photography of Lewis Watts, Oakland Museum of California, Oakland, California

Publications

Filmography
 2016 – Independent Lens (TV series, documentary advisor for 1 episode) 
 2015 – Dogtown Redemption (Documentary) (advisor)
 2014 – Through a Lens Darkly: Black Photographers and the Emergence of a People (Documentary)
 1999 – Neighborhoods: The Hidden Cities of San Francisco (advisor)

References

External links 
 

Living people
African-American photographers
African-American contemporary artists
American contemporary artists
American artists
1946 births
Photographers from California
21st-century African-American people
20th-century African-American people
Artists from Little Rock, Arkansas